The Livonian Knighthood was a fiefdom that existed in Livonia (now Southern Estonia and Northern Latvia). It was formed in 1561 by Baltic German nobles and disbanded in 1917 in Estonia, and in 1920 in Latvia. Like other Baltic knighthoods, the Livonian also had semi-autonomous privileged status in the Russian Empire.

History 
Within the individual territories Old Livland the vassal genders joined forces to defend and maintain their rights and possessions into knighthoods. These corporate organizations were already provided with sovereign rights in the 14th century and were officially recognized.

The privileges of the knighthood were each confirmed by changing sovereigns, so happened in 1561 by the King of Poland Sigismund II August, 1629 by Gustav II Adolf, the king of Sweden, and in 1710 by the Russian Tsar Peter I.

Through the agricultural legislation of the years 1816 to 1819, the landowning nobility of the Baltic governorates were given the right and duty to set up elementary schools (also called "peasant schools") in the estate districts and villages belonging to them. For instance, issues of education of the rural population in the Livonian Knights' Landtag repeatedly gave rise to debates the Conservatives and Reformers in the Livonian nobility, as well as in the Livonian provincial synod of the Evangelical Lutheran Church.

In the wake of the October Revolution in Russia in 1917 and the turmoil of World War I, Estonia declared its independence from Russia on February 24, 1918, and Latvia on November 18, 1918, as republics. Attempts by the German Empire to bring the Baltic politically under German sovereignty with the creation of the United Baltic Duchy failed in November 1918 finally. The Livonian Knighthood was subsequently dissolved as statutory corporation.

In 1920, the Livonian Non-profit Association was founded in Riga, and the members of the Knights, who had emigrated to the German Reich, founded the Association of the Livonian Stammadel in Rostock. These associations continued the tradition of knighthood. In 1949, the present Association of Baltic Noble Corporations e.V. founded in which the Livonian knighthood is integrated together with its three sister Nobel communities.

The coat of arms of the Livonian knighthood 

The coat of arms of the Livonian knighthood was awarded by the King of Poland in 1566 on the occasion of the real union between the Grand Duchy of Lithuania and the Duchy of Livonia. It is the coat of arms of the Livonian administrator and commander Jan Hieronimowicz Chodkiewicz with the initials of King Sigismund II Augustus.

Land Marshals of the Livonian Knights  
From 1695 to 1710 there were "Landtag directors" and from 1783 to 1797 "Marshal of Nobility".

 1643     : Otto von Mengden
 1643     : Engelbrecht by Mengden
 1645     : Johann Eberhard von Bellingshausen
 1646     : Henry of Cronstians
 1646     : Ernst von Mengden
 1648-1650: Hermann von Gordian
 1650-1653: Gustav Adolf Clodt of Jürgensburg
 1653-1660: Gustav von Mengden
 1660-1664: Gustav Carl von Wulffen
 1664-1667: Gotthard Johann von Budberg
 1667-1673: Jacob Stael von Holstein
 1669-1670: Johann von Buddenbrock
 1673-1676: Otto Friedrich von Vietinghoff
 1676-1680: Ernst Johann von Rosen
 1680-1683: Otto Reinhold von Albedyll
 1683-1690: Georg (Jürgen) Conrad von Ungern-Sternberg
 1690-1693: Johann Heinrich Streiff von Lauenstein
 1695, 1697: Gustav Ernst von Albedyll
 1697     : Ernst von Plater
 1699-1700: Leonhard Gustav von Budberg
 1710     : Georg Reinhold von Tiesenhausen
 1710     : Johann Albrecht von Mengden
 1710-1712: Magnus Gustav von Mengden
 1712-1717: Magnus Johann von Plater
 1715-1729: Berend Dietrich von Bock (Dorpater circle)
 1720-1723: Woldemar Johann von Ungern-Sternberg (Dorpater circle)
 1717-1721: Otto Christoph von Richter
 1723-1727: Gotthard Wilhelm von Budberg
 1727-1730: Gotthard Wilhelm von Berg
 1730-1737: Caspar Friedrich von Buddenbrock
 1737-1742: Johann Gustav von Budberg
 1742-1747: Heinrich Gustav von Patkul
 1747-1759: Gustav Heinrich von Igelström
 1759-1765: Leonhard Johann von Budberg
 1765     : Adolf Heinrich von Anrep
 1769-1775: Carl Gustav von Mengden
 1775-1777: Caspar Heinrich von Rosenkampf
 1777-1783: Franz Wilhelm von Rennenkampff
 1783-1786: Leonhard Johann von Budberg
 1786-1792: Moritz Friedrich von Gersdorff
 1792-1797: Friedrich von Sievers
 1797     : Otto Johann Magnus of Richter
 1798-1800: Christian Friedrich von Ungern-Sternberg
 1800-1803: Gustav Johann von Buddenbrock
 1803-1806: Carl Gustav von Samson-Himmelstjerna
 1808-1809: Carl Johann von Numers
 1809-1812: Andreas von Below
 1812-1818: Friedrich Reinhold Schoultz of Ascheraden
 1818-1822: Friedrich von Löwis of Menar
 1822-1824: Otto von Richter (vicar)
 1824-1827: Georg Carl von Jarmersted
 1827-1830: Friedrich Johann von Löwenwolde
 1830-1833: Friedrich von Grote
 1833-1836: Carl Gotthard von Liphart
 1836-1838: Eduard von Richter
 1839-1842: Alexander of Oettingen
 1842-1844: Ferdinand August Nikolaus von Hagemeister
 1844-1848: Carl Reinhold Georg von Lilienfeld
 1848-1851: Hamilcar von Fölkersahm
 1851-1854: Gustav Fromhold of Nolcken
 1854-1856: Christian von Stein
 1857-1862: August Georg Friedrich von Oettingen
 1862-1866: Paul von Lieven
 1866-1869: Georg Carl von Lilienfeld
 1869-1870: Gustav Fromhold of Nolcken
 1870-1872: Nikolai Conrad Peter of Oettingen
 1872-1884: Heinrich Anton Hermann von Bock
 1884-1908: Friedrich von Meyendorff
 1906-1918: Adolf Pilar von Pilchau
 1918-1919: Heinrich Eduard von Stryk

See also
Baltic nobility
Governorate of Livonia
Estonian Knighthood

References 

Baltic nobility
Estonian nobility
Latvian nobility
Livonian nobility
History of Livonia
1561 establishments in Europe
1917 disestablishments